Biorefining is the process of "building" multiple products from biomass as a feedstock or raw material much like a petroleum refinery that is currently in use. A biorefinery is a facility like a petroleum refinery that comprises the various process steps or unit operations and related equipment to produce various bioproducts including fuels, power, materials and chemicals from biomass. Industrial biorefineries have been identified as the most promising route to the creation of a new domestic biobased industry producing entire spectrum of bioproducts or bio-based products.

Biomass has various components such as lignin, cellulose, hemicellulose, extractives, etc. Biorefinery can take advantage of the unique properties of each of biomass components enabling the production of various products. The various bioproducts can include fiber, fuels, chemicals, plastics etc.

Research
Some research is being conducted as well in order to improve the manufacturing processes. For example, to make plastics, paint, medicines, antifreeze out of syngas, a new catalyst has been invented by Krijn de Jong.

See also

 Biomass
 Biomass (ecology)
 Forest
 Agriculture
 Biogas
 Bioenergy
 Biofuels
 Biochemicals
 Bioproducts

References

Biofuels technology
Biotechnology
Synthetic fuel technologies